Jan Bosman (27 November 1945 – 28 September 1992) was a Dutch judoka. He competed in the men's half-heavyweight event at the 1972 Summer Olympics.

References

External links
 

1945 births
1992 deaths
Dutch male judoka
Olympic judoka of the Netherlands
Judoka at the 1972 Summer Olympics
Sportspeople from Amsterdam